The Sailor Moon video game series is based on Naoko Takeuchi's manga and anime series of the same name. The series was released in Japan during the height of the media franchise's popularity. By 1995, there were ten game releases, each with sales figures of about 200,000 to 300,000. By 1998, twenty games were released.

Nintendo systems

Sega systems

PlayStation

Playdia

Other systems

Mobile

Other games featuring Sailor Moon characters

References

Bandai games
Bandai Namco franchises
Banpresto games
Kodansha franchises
 
Video games
Lists of video games by franchise